Wrubel is a transcription of the Polish surname Wróbel.
It may refer to:

Allie Wrubel (1905–1973), American composer and songwriter
Art Wrubel (born 1965), American businessman
Stephen Wrubel (born 1967), American photographer

See also 
 Vrubel
 

Polish-language surnames